Pawn Sacrifice is a 2014 American biographical drama film about chess player Bobby Fischer. It follows Fischer's challenge against top Soviet chess grandmasters during the Cold War and culminating in the World Chess Championship 1972 match versus Boris Spassky in Reykjavík, Iceland. It was directed by Edward Zwick and written by Steven Knight, and stars Tobey Maguire as Fischer, Liev Schreiber as Spassky, Lily Rabe as Joan Fischer, and Peter Sarsgaard as William Lombardy. It was released in the United States on September 16, 2015.

The film received generally positive reviews, with many critics praising Maguire's performance, but grossed only $5 million worldwide against a budget of $19 million.

Plot
In 1972, Bobby Fischer tears apart his hotel room in a paranoid delusional state, believing he is being spied upon by the Soviet KGB.

Two decades earlier, in 1951 Brooklyn, Fischer's mother, a Soviet Jewish immigrant, explains to 8-year-old Bobby that the FBI has her under surveillance because she supports Marxist revolution in the U.S. She coaches Bobby on what to say to the FBI if he is ever approached.

Bobby immerses himself in chess and becomes an expert player. Despite her worries that chess is becoming an obsession, his mother takes him to an adult chess club, where he impresses the resident chess master and is accepted as a student. Bobby enters the world of professional chess championships and soon becomes the youngest grandmaster ever.

Bobby's hatred of distractions leads to frequent tantrums. He enters a team tournament in Varna, Bulgaria, where he realizes Soviet grandmasters are deliberately drawing games with the collusion of the World Chess Federation. Erupting in a rant that this system makes it impossible for a non-Soviet player to win the championship, Bobby quits the tournament and gives up chess.

When Bobby returns to the U.S., lawyer Paul Marshall offers to help him modify the tournament rules, working pro bono to give Fischer a fair chance to win future tournaments. Fischer re-enters professional chess and selects Father William Lombardy, a former World Junior Chess Champion and Roman Catholic priest, as his second. Lombardy struggles to calm Bobby's rock-star behavior and impossible demands.

As his demands are accepted, Bobby overcomes most grandmasters across the world and nears the world championship, becoming a hero to the American public. At the height of the Cold War, Soviet domination of the World Chess Championship is being exploited for propaganda as proof that the Communist system is superior to American democracy. U.S. President Richard Nixon and Secretary of State Henry Kissinger closely monitor and encourage Bobby's progress.

Privately, Lombardy tells Marshall that excessive focus on chess strategy has destroyed the sanity of the game's greatest players.

During a tournament in Santa Monica, California, Bobby loses to Soviet grandmaster Boris Spassky, the world champion. The next morning, an enraged Bobby approaches and berates Spassky on the beach.

As he pursues the world championship, the pressure drives Bobby into paranoia and delusional psychosis. Meeting with Marshall, Bobby's sister Joan quotes from her brother's letters about how the Communists collude with International Jewry to destroy him. Joan explains that Bobby believes this despite being Jewish himself and pleads with Marshall to arrange for Bobby to receive psychiatric help. Marshall is dismissive, but as Bobby's breakdown escalates, he suggests to Lombardy that Bobby needs therapy and medication, which Lombardy rebuffs.

Reporters and fans from around the world assemble at Reykjavík, Iceland, to witness the historic World Chess Championship 1972 match between Bobby and Spassky. Bobby loses the first game and fails to appear for the second, losing it by forfeit. Bobby is easily distracted by small noises from the audience, rolling cameras, and the hard sound of the chessboard, which leads him to make extreme demands for silence and fewer distractions, which could cause another forfeit. Spassky, insulted by the possibility of maintaining his title by forfeit, orders the Soviet entourage to accede to Bobby's demands.

Bobby wins the third game by unconventional tactics. Game four is a draw, but Bobby wins game five after Spassky himself begins showing paranoia signs. Experts speculate the next game will determine the outcome of the match. In game six, Bobby uses an opening he has never played before, surprising the audience. His inspired play amazes Spassky, who resigns and leads a standing ovation of Bobby's victory.

A postscript reveals Bobby went on to win the match and that his sixth game against Spassky is still considered the greatest chess game ever played. However, his delusions worsened, and he went on to forfeit his title and died in 2008 as a fugitive from U.S. prosecution.

Cast
 Tobey Maguire as Bobby Fischer
 Seamus Davey-Fitzpatrick as teenage Bobby Fischer
 Aiden Lovekamp as young Bobby Fischer
 Liev Schreiber as Boris Spassky
 Lily Rabe as Joan Fischer
 Sophie Nélisse as young Joan
 Peter Sarsgaard as William Lombardy
 Michael Stuhlbarg as Paul Marshall
 Robin Weigert as Regina Fischer
 Conrad Pla as Carmine Nigro
 Evelyne Brochu as Donna
 Katie Nolan as Maria
 Edward Zinoviev as Efim Geller
 Brett Watson as Chief Arbiter Lothar Schmid

Title meaning
Director Edward Zwick explained the meaning of the film's title: "You have Henry Kissinger and Richard Nixon calling Bobby Fischer; you have Brezhnev and the KGB agents following Boris Spassky. Both of these men were pawns of their nations."

Production
Principal photography began in early October 2013 in Reykjavík, Iceland. In mid-October, the remaining 41 days of shooting began in Montreal, Canada, wrapping in Los Angeles on December 11, 2013.

Release 
The film had its world premiere at the 2014 Toronto International Film Festival on September 11, 2014. On September 10, 2014, Bleecker Street acquired the U.S. distribution rights to the film, the company's first acquisition. The film was originally set to be released in the United States on September 18, 2015; however, it was pushed up to September 16, with wide releases in both America and Canada on September 25, 2015.

Released on home media on December 22, 2015, the film made $1.1 million in DVD and Blu-ray sales over its first few months.

Reception

Box office
Pawn Sacrifice has grossed $2.4 million in North America and $3.1 million in other territories for a worldwide total of $5.6 million, against a budget of $19 million.

The film grossed $1 million in the opening weekend of its wide release, finishing 12th at the box office.

Critical response 
On review aggregator Rotten Tomatoes, the film has a rating of 72% based on 120 reviews, with an average rating of 6.41/10. The website's critical consensus reads: "Anchored by a sensitive performance from Tobey Maguire, Pawn Sacrifice adds another solidly gripping drama to the list of films inspired by chess wiz Bobby Fischer." On Metacritic, the film has a weighted average score of 65 out of 100, based on 29 critics, indicating "generally favorable reviews".

Spassky himself has called the film "weak" and said that it has "no intrigue"; he noted that the film misrepresents how and why he agreed to continue the match after Fischer failed to show up for the second game.

Anatoly Karpov assessed the film negatively: “Maybe the film is not bad for the popularization of chess, but its content is terrible. There are many inaccuracies. The chess positions are simply idiotic. The film is quite budgetary, so take a chess consultant, pay him a fee, he will correct your position. And then there the diagonal from left to right is white. You are making a film about world champions, and such bloopers, for me as a professional, are terrible”.

See also
List of books and documentaries by or about Bobby Fischer
Sacrifice as a common chess move, often with pawns
The Queen's Gambit

References

External links
 
 
 
 Official screenplay
 Pawn Sacrifice at History vs. Hollywood

2014 films
2010s English-language films
2014 biographical drama films
2014 thriller drama films
Cold War films
American independent films
American thriller drama films
American biographical drama films
Films scored by James Newton Howard
Films directed by Edward Zwick
Films about chess
Films produced by Gail Katz
Films produced by Tobey Maguire
Films set in the 1950s
Films set in the 1960s
Films set in the 1970s
Films set in Brooklyn
Films set in Bulgaria
Films set in Reykjavík
Films set in Los Angeles
Films shot in Iceland
Films shot in Los Angeles
Films shot in Montreal
Films with screenplays by Steven Knight
Thriller films based on actual events
Drama films based on actual events
Works about Bobby Fischer
Bleecker Street films
Cultural depictions of chess players
2014 independent films
2010s American films